The 1988 Kilkenny Senior Hurling Championship was the 94th staging of the Kilkenny Senior Hurling Championship since its establishment by the Kilkenny County Board.

Glenmore were the defending champions.

Ballyhale Shamrocks won the championship after a 2–15 to 0–04 defeat of Thomastown in the final. It was their seventh championship title overall and their first title in three championship seasons.

References

Kilkenny Senior Hurling Championship
Kilkenny Senior Hurling Championship